Maxwell Richard Crosbie Ward, 6th Viscount Bangor  (4 May 1868 – 17 November 1950), was an Irish peer and politician.

Early life and education
Ward was born to Henry Ward, 5th Viscount Bangor, and his first wife, scientific illustrator Mary Ward, who died in the world's first motoring accident.

He was educated at Harrow School and the Royal Military Academy, Woolwich.

Military service
Ward was commissioned a second lieutenant in the Royal Artillery on 23 July 1887, and promoted to lieutenant on 23 July 1890. He was promoted to captain on 1 April 1898, appointed divisional adjutant in February 1900, and Instructor at the School of Gunnery on 10 October 1900. Promotion to major came in 1906. After his father's death in 1911, he succeeded to the title of Viscount Bangor. He retired from active duty in 1912 and commanded the Antrim Royal Garrison Reserve Artillery. He was recommissioned in 1914 after the start of the First World War. He was appointed an Officer of the Order of the British Empire in the 1919 New Year Honours.

Political career
He was a representative peer in the House of Lords from 1913 to 1950 and an Ulster Unionist member of the Senate of Northern Ireland from 1921 until his death in 1950. He was Deputy Leader of the Senate and Parliamentary Secretary in the Department of the Prime Minister from 1929 to 1930 before serving as Speaker of the Senate from 1930 to 1950.

Family
Ward married, in 1905, Agnes Elizabeth (née Hamilton), with whom he had one son and three daughters. He was succeeded by his son Edward Ward, a journalist who made his name as a BBC foreign correspondent.

He died at his home, Castle Ward, at the age of 82.

References

1868 births
1950 deaths
Ulster Unionist Party members of the Senate of Northern Ireland
Members of the Privy Council of Northern Ireland
Members of the Senate of Northern Ireland 1921–1925
Members of the Senate of Northern Ireland 1925–1929
Members of the Senate of Northern Ireland 1929–1933
Members of the Senate of Northern Ireland 1933–1937
Members of the Senate of Northern Ireland 1937–1941
Members of the Senate of Northern Ireland 1941–1945
Members of the Senate of Northern Ireland 1945–1949
Members of the Senate of Northern Ireland 1949–1953
Northern Ireland junior government ministers (Parliament of Northern Ireland)
Irish representative peers
People educated at Harrow School
Graduates of the Royal Military Academy, Woolwich
Royal Artillery officers
Officers of the Order of the British Empire
Maxwell
Maxwell